The individual eventing at the 2008 Summer Olympics took place between August 9 and 12 2008 at the Hong Kong Sports Institute.

Individual eventing consisted of four phases: dressage, cross-country, and two phases of show-jumping. Scores from each phase were converted into penalty points, which were summed to give a score.

In the dressage portion, the pair performed in front of three judges. The judges gave marks of between 0 and 10 for each of ten required elements; the scores for the judges were averaged to give a score between 0 and 100. That score was then subtracted from 100 and multiplied by 1.5 to give the number of penalty points.

The cross-county portion consisted of a 4.56 kilometer course with 29 obstacles. The target time was eight minutes; pairs received .4 penalty points for every second above that time. They also received 20 penalty points for every obstacle not cleanly jumped.

The final phases were show-jumping; pairs had to negotiate a course of obstacles. The pair received 4 penalty points for each obstacle at which there was a refusal or a knockdown of the obstacle. One penalty point was also assessed for each second taken above the maximum time for the course.

The top 25 pairs after the first jumping portion (limited to three pairs per nation) took part in a second phase of jumping; the scores from this jumping final were added to the scores of the first three phases to give a grand final.

The results of the individual phase were also used in the team eventing event, though that event did not use the second jumping phase.

Medalists

Results 
The total score for each horse and rider was the sum of the total penalty points earned in the various phases of competitions.  The pair with the lowest number of penalty points was victorious.

Summary 

 Phillip Dutton qualified for the final show jumping event round on 68.2 faults (sixteenth place) and jumped a clear round to move up to twelfth place, but was disqualified because weighted boots worn by his horse exceeded the maximum limit.
 Four riders did not qualify for the final jumping round as three others from their nation had already qualified, The positions of these riders after the first jumping round (and after Dutton's disqualification) were: Frank Osholt (8th), Lucinda fredericks (10th), Shane Rose (17th) and Daisy Dick (23rd).

Dressage 
For the dressage portion of the competition, horse and rider pairs performed series of movements that were evaluated by judges.  Judges gave marks of 0 to 10 for each movement, subtracting points for errors.  The score for each judge was represented by a percentage of marks possible that were gained.  Scores from the three judges were averaged for an overall percentage.  This was then subtracted from 100 and multiplied by 1.5 to determine the number of penalty points awarded for the round.

Cross country 
The cross-county portion consisted of a 4.56 kilometer course with 29 obstacles. The target time was eight minutes; pairs received .4 penalty points for every second above that time. They also received 20 penalty points for every obstacle not cleanly jumped.

Show jumping

Jumping final

References

External links
 

Equestrian at the 2008 Summer Olympics